Goes on a Field Trip is the second and final album by Canadian pop punk band LiveonRelease, released by Her Royal Majesty's Records in January 2003 (see 2003 in music). The album is an enhanced CD that features music videos of "Let's Go" and "Emotional Griptape".

Track listing
"Let's Go" – 2:45
"Jaded" – 4:10
"Falling" – 3:21
"Inside My Head" – 3:24
"Losing Gravity" – 3:27
"Somebody Else Said" – 3:40
"Paranoid" – 2:34
"Lost In The Moment" – 2:36
"China Silk" – 2:04
"Do You Want Me" – 2:23
"I Don't Care" – 2:53
"Runnin'" – 3:48

LiveonRelease albums
2003 albums